Zaritsky is a surname. Notable people with the surname include:

 John Zaritsky (born 1943), Canadian film maker
 Joseph Zaritsky (1891-1985), Israeli artist
 Max Zaritsky (1885-1959), American union leader

See also
 Oscar Zariski (1899-1986), American mathematician (born Oscher Zaritsky)
 Mikhail Zaritskiy (born 1973), Luxembourgian footballer